is a Buzan Shingon temple in Tosashimizu, Kōchi Prefecture, Japan. The temple is said to have been founded by Gyōki in 822.

Kongōfuku-ji is 85 km south of Temple 37 (Iwamoto-ji) and can take an average pilgrim 30 hours to reach on foot. This is the furthest distance between two temples on the Shikoku Pilgrimage.

Buildings
 Hondō
 Sanmon: 
 Shōrō
 : Shrine within the temple grounds to conduct Goma rituals to ask for blessing from deities. Goma is conducted by burning cedar sticks available for purchase next to the gomadō.

See also

 Shikoku 88 Temple Pilgrimage
 Shikoku Henro Association Homepage

References

Buddhist temples in Kōchi Prefecture